Vera Aleksandrovna Ganeeva born 6 November 1988 in Kamyshin) is a Russian athlete. She represented Russia in discus at the 2012 Summer Olympics. She finished 23rd but was disqualified in 2017 after testing positive for turinabol. She was given a two-year ban. In February 2019, the Court of Arbitration for Sport handed her another two-year ban for doping, starting from 2 July 2018.

Achievements

See also
List of doping cases in athletics

References

1988 births
Living people
People from Kamyshin
Sportspeople from Volgograd Oblast
Russian female discus throwers
Olympic female discus throwers
Olympic athletes of Russia
Athletes (track and field) at the 2012 Summer Olympics
Universiade gold medalists in athletics (track and field)
Universiade gold medalists for Russia
Competitors at the 2011 Summer Universiade
Medalists at the 2013 Summer Universiade
World Athletics Championships athletes for Russia
Russian Athletics Championships winners
Russian sportspeople in doping cases
Doping cases in athletics
21st-century Russian women